Keteleeria evelyniana (Evelyn keteleeria, Vietnamese: Du sam) is a species of conifer native to southern China, Laos and Vietnam.

Taxonomic notes
Syn: Keteleeria delavayi Van Tieghem 1891; K. dopiana Flous 1936; K. roulletii Flous 1936; K. hainanensis Chun et Tsiang 1963; K. evelyniana var. pendula Hsueh 1983. Farjon (1989) provides a thorough taxonomic review of the genus.

Range and ecology
Laos, Vietnam (as far south as the Plateau of Lang Bian near Da Lat), and China: SW Sichuan, Yunnan (where it probably intergrades with K. davidiana), and possibly the central mountains of Hainan.

Keteleeria evelyniana grows in Vietnam at elevations above  and is shade intolerant, prefers neutral soils, and is typically associated with Pinus spp. or with species of Fagaceae and Lauraceae. It is the most widespread conifer in northwest Vietnam.

Cultivation and uses
The timber of Keteleeria evelyniana is insect resistant and is useful for construction and household furniture making. It may also be used in construction, railroad ties, mine timbering and sundry house implements. The seeds are rich in essential oil that can be used for burning and soap manufacturing. The tree can also be used in traditional medicine.

In mid-December 2009, a Keteleeria evelyniana located in Seattle's Washington Park Arboretum was cut down. It was thought that the unknown person who was responsible for the cutting down of the tree took it for a Christmas tree. The tree was planted in 1998, transplanted from China's Yunnan province.

In 2013, the species was listed as vulnerable on The IUCN Red List of Threatened Species after a 2010 assessment which found the tree's population to be in significant decline and fragmented.

Remarks
Listed (as K. roulletii) as threatened in Vietnam by the World Conservation Monitoring Centre.

References

Pinaceae
Least concern plants
Trees of China
Trees of Laos
Trees of Vietnam